Greven (Westphalian: Graiwen) is a medium-sized town in the district of Steinfurt, in Germany's most populous state of North Rhine-Westphalia and close to the city of Münster.

Geography
Greven is situated on the river Ems, approx. 25 km south-east of Rheine and 15 km north of Münster.

Division of the town
Greven consists of the following districts
 Greven
 Reckenfeld
 Gimbte
 Schmedehausen

Neighbouring municipalities

Transport

Airport
Greven is home to North Rhine-Westphalia's fourth-largest airport Münster Osnabrück International Airport (IATA code: FMO) transporting approx. 2.5 mil. passengers in 2009, but only  1.2 mil. in 2012 to destinations in Europe, Asia Minor, and North Africa.

Railway
 Regional express trains (Regional Express) - these trains do not stop at all stations:
 Emden (north sea)-Leer(Ostfriesland)-Meppen-Lingen(Emsland)-Rheine-Greven-Münster Hauptbahnhof (Main railway station). 
 Regional trains (Regional Bahn) - these trains stop at all stations:
 Rheine-Mesum-Emsdetten-Reckenfeld-Greven-Münster Sprakel-Münster Zentrum Nord-Münster Hauptbahnhof(Main railway station).

Roads
The autobahn A1 from Heiligenhafen in Schleswig-Holstein to Saarbrücken passes near Greven, furthermore 2 bundesstrassen, B481 and B219.

Waterways
The Dortmund-Ems Canal crosses through Greven and was lately enlarged to carry ships up to 2,000 tons.

Twin towns – sister cities

Greven is twinned with:
 Montargis, France (1968)

See also
Emsa (household goods) (1949)

References

External links
 

Towns in North Rhine-Westphalia
Steinfurt (district)